USS LST-12 was an  of the United States Navy. LST-12 was transferred to the Royal Navy in early 1943, to serve in the Mediterranean Theater of Operations during 1943 and 1944. She never saw service with the US Navy.

Construction 
LST-12 was laid down on 16 August 1942, by the Dravo Corporation in Pittsburgh, Pennsylvania; launched on 7 December 1942; sponsored by Mrs. Joseph Fay. She was transferred to the Royal Navy 25 March 1943, and commissioned 26 March.

Service history 
LST-12 left Galveston, Texas, on 10 April 1943, with Convoy HK 168, en route to Key West, Florida, arriving 14 April 1943.

LST-12 left from Hampton Roads, Virginia for the Mediterranean on 14 May 1943, with convoy UGS 8A, arriving in Oran, Algeria, sometime before 8 June 1943, breaking down en route. Records also show that she left Gibraltar on 21 June 1943, with Convoy GTX 3, and traveled to Port Said, Egypt, arriving 4 July 1943.

Mediterranean and European operations 
LST-12 was assigned to the European theater and participated in the Sicilian occupation in July and August 1943, and the Invasion of Reggio and the Salerno landings in September 1943. On 13 November 1943, she struck a mine but was able to make Ferryville under her own power to be repaired. However, records indicate that she was also part of Convoy BM 74 from 11 November to 16 November 1943, traveling from Bombay, India to Colombo, British Ceylon.

In August and September 1944, LST-12 was the only British LST to take part in Operation Dragoon, the Invasion of southern France.

From September 1944 to January 1945, she operated between Italy, Yugoslavia, and Greece.

Postwar service 
Between August and October 1945, she was refit at Antwerp before being paid off at New York 5 January 1946, and returned to the US Navy. On 20 March 1946, LST-12 was struck from the Naval Register.

LST-12 was sold on 11 September 1947, to Washburn Wire Co., Phillipsdale, Rhode Island.

References

Bibliography

External links

1942 ships
Ships built in Pittsburgh
LST-1-class tank landing ships of the United States Navy
LST-1-class tank landing ships of the Royal Navy
World War II amphibious warfare vessels of the United States
World War II amphibious warfare vessels of the United Kingdom
Ships built by Dravo Corporation